Raajjé Online (ROL) (Dhivehi: ރާއްޖެ އޮންލައިން) is a broadband internet service provided by Focus Infocom Private Limited.

History
ROL internet services was initially delivered using fixed and wireless (nomadic/mobile) radio technology.

Investor Relations

 WARF Telecom International - a joint venture company formed between Ooredoo Maldives, Reliance Infocomm of India and Focus Infocom to install a Submarine fibre cable system between Maldives and India linking Maldives to the global submarine fibre cable system.

Technical Partners

 SingTel - Providing international Internet backbone connectivity, V-SAT and other IP services
 Ooredoo Maldives  - Partner in Submarine optic Fibre Cable system and provision of microwave backhaul connectivity to islands
 Reliance Infocom (India) - Partner in the implementation of submarine optic fibre cable system
 Smart Bridges Singapore -Provision of Wireless Radio Systems
 Local cable operators - Provision of HFC network Capacity for Distribution of Internet
 Sky Pilot Networks (USA)

See also

 Telecommunications in the Maldives

References
Corporate Info
Haveeru Daily (January 18, 2004). "Focus Infocom starts service as second ISP in Maldives"
Haveeru Daily (May 24, 2003). "Second ISP license given to Focus Infocom"

Notes

External links 
 ROL Official website

Telecommunications companies of the Maldives
Internet service providers of the Maldives
Malé